Chris Triantis (born 12 October 1987 in Sydney) is an Australian footballer who plays for Bankstown City.

Early years
Born in Sydney, the eldest of ten children (Eleni Triantis being the youngest), Triantis attended his father's alma mater, Newington College (2002–2004). At 16 he left school and took up a scholarship in France with FC Metz, where he played in the reserves.

Club career
On 22 August 2008 he signed with Sydney FC's inaugural National Youth League side. He captained the side to the 2009 National Youth League championship in 2–0 win against Adelaide United. However, he was unable to stay with the youth side due to being overage for the next season.

On 10 March 2009 he returned to his previous club Sydney Olympic FC.

On 7 August 2009 he was signed by the Newcastle Jets. He was given a shock starting berth for the Jets opening game of the 2009–2010 season, given that he had not made any senior A-League appearances previously, and had only been signed the day before the game.
On 26 July 2010 Triantis made his first appearance for English club Oxford United as a trialist. He played against Brackley Town and lost 1–0 with the team.

In 2012 Chris Triantis the talented number 10 was crowned the 2012 Gold Medal winner at the official Gold Medal Dinner awards described as a "lavish affair for the NSW Premier League and NSW’s top tier competition".

Chris Triantis signed for Sydney United 58 under Coach Mark Rudan for the 2013 NSW Priemer League Season

2013 Chris Triantis suffered an ACL injury to his right knee resulting in a season-ending injury.

Honours
With Sydney FC:
 National Youth League Championship: 2008–2009
 NSW Premier League Gold Medal Winner 2012

References

1987 births
Australian soccer players
Living people
People educated at Newington College
Sydney FC players
Australian people of Greek descent
Newcastle Jets FC players
Sydney United 58 FC players
Sydney Olympic FC players
National Premier Leagues players
Association football midfielders